Nawal Michelle Ayoub Valderrama is a Colombian, from Lebanese ancestry, beauty queen. During 2004, she represented Bogota, as Miss Bogota, in the Miss Colombia beauty pageant. Also, She was crowned Miss Earth Lebanon 2014 and competed in the Miss Earth 2014 pageant.

References

External links
 Miss Earth Official Website
 Missosology - Middle Eastern Beauty Pageants

Year of birth missing (living people)
Miss Colombia
Cartagena, Colombia
Lebanese beauty pageant winners
Living people
Colombian people of Lebanese descent
People from Barranquilla